The Bonneterre Formation is an Upper Cambrian geologic formation which outcrops in the St. Francois Mountains of the Missouri Ozarks. The Bonneterre is a major host rock for the lead ores of the Missouri Lead Belt.

The Bonneterre Formation lies conformably on the Lamotte Sandstone and in places lies directly on the Proterozoic igneous core of the mountains. The Bonneterre is conformably overlain by the Davis Formation.  In the outcrop area the Bonneterre has an average thickness of 375 to 400 feet. It is present in the subsurface throughout Missouri and has a maximum recorded thickness of 1580 feet under Pemiscot County in the Missouri Bootheel.

The formation is dominantly dolomite with areas or layers of pure limestone. A shaley or glauconitic zone occurs in the lower portion and the base contains sand and conglomerate or breccia where the formation overlaps the Lamotte and lies directly on the granite of the mountain core.

Fossil content 
The formation has provided fossils of:

Monoplacophora 
 Hypseloconus bonneterrense
 Irondalia
 I. irondalensis
 Kirengella washingtonense

 Ulrichoconus
 U. bonneterrense

Trilobites 
 Kingstoniidae
 Blountia sp.
 Tricrepicephalidae
 Tricrepicephalus sp.

Gastropods 
 Tropidodiscidae
 Strepsodiscus major

See also 

 List of fossiliferous stratigraphic units in Missouri
 List of fossiliferous stratigraphic units in Minnesota
 List of fossiliferous stratigraphic units in Illinois
 Paleontology in Illinois
 Paleontology in Minnesota
 Paleontology in Missouri
 Minaret Formation

References

Bibliography 
 
 

Geologic formations of Illinois
Geologic formations of Minnesota
Geologic formations of Missouri
Cambrian System of North America
Cambrian Missouri
Cambrian Minnesota
Cambrian Illinois
Guzhangian
Dolomite formations
Reef deposits
Cambrian northern paleotemperate deposits
Paleontology in Missouri
Landforms of the Ozarks
St. Francois Mountains